Enteromius pobeguini is a species of ray-finned fish in the genus Enteromius from the basin of the Blue Nile include ingLake Tana in Ethiopia.

References 

 

Enteromius
Fish described in 1911
Taxa named by Jacques Pellegrin